Rejectaria is a genus of litter moths of the family Erebidae. The genus was erected by Achille Guenée in 1854.

Species
Rejectaria albisinuata (Smith, 1905) Arizona
Rejectaria amicalis (Maassen, 1890) Ecuador
Rejectaria antorides (H. Druce, 1891) Costa Rica
Rejectaria anysis (H. Druce, 1891) Mexico, Panama
Rejectaria aratus (H. Druce, 1891) Panama
Rejectaria arenacea (Schaus, 1913) Costa Rica
Rejectaria atrax (Dognin, 1891) Ecuador
Rejectaria carapa (Felder & Rogenhofer, 1874) Brazil (Amazonas)
Rejectaria chisena (Schaus, 1906) Brazil (Paraná)
Rejectaria cocytalis Guenée, 1854 Cayenne, Venezuela
Rejectaria craftsalis Schaus, 1916 Panama
Rejectaria cucutalis Schaus, 1916 Venezuela
Rejectaria erebalis Guenée, 1854 Brazil
Rejectaria fulvibrunnea (Dognin, 1914) Peru
Rejectaria funebris (Schaus, 1912) Costa Rica, French Guiana
Rejectaria gallinalis (Felder & Rogenhofer, 1874) Venezuela
Rejectaria incola Dognin, 1914 Ecuador
Rejectaria lineata (Dognin, 1914) Peru
Rejectaria lysandria (H. Druce, 1891) Mexico, Guatemala, Panama
Rejectaria lyse (H. Druce, 1891) Panama
Rejectaria maera (H. Druce, 1891) Panama
Rejectaria magas (H. Druce, 1891) Panama
Rejectaria niciasalis (Walker, [1859]) Brazil
Rejectaria nucina (Dognin, 1914) Ecuador
Rejectaria pallescens (Dognin, 1914) Peru
Rejectaria panola Schaus, 1933 Brazil (Paraná)
Rejectaria parvipunctalis Schaus, 1916 Brazil (Espírito Santo)
Rejectaria paulosa (Schaus, 1906) Brazil (São Paulo)
Rejectaria pharusalis (Walker, [1859]) Venezuela
Rejectaria prunescens (Warren, 1889) Brazil (Amazonas)
Rejectaria rosimonalis (Walker, [1859]) Venezuela
Rejectaria splendida (Schaus, 1912) Costa Rica
Rejectaria theclalis (Walker, [1859]) Brazil (Amazonas)
Rejectaria villavicencia Dognin, 1924 Colombia
Rejectaria villosa (H. Druce, 1891) Panama
Rejectaria virbiusalis (Walker, [1859]) Venezuela
Rejectaria zenos Schaus, 1916 Cayenne

References

Herminiinae
Moth genera